Dennis Anthony Blake (born 6 September 1970 in Saint Elizabeth Parish) is a retired male sprinter from Jamaica. He is a two-time Olympian, winning the bronze medal at the 1996 Summer Olympics in Atlanta, Georgia, where he ran in the qualifying heats.

Career
Blake was awarded a two-year scholarship to attend Blinn Junior College, in Texas. Having gained recognition for his athletic performances, he was awarded thirty-nine athletic scholarships to attend universities throughout the United States, including Alabama A&M University, his alma mater. During his track & field career at Alabama A&M University (AAMU), Blake was the recipient of numerous awards and recognition. The nine-time All-American was selected as the "Most Valuable Player" at the Southern Intercollegiate Athletic Conference (SIAC) championship winning the Abbott Award.

Blake competed in the 1992 Summer Olympics in Barcelona, Spain where he was the official Jamaica flag bearer. Blake also claimed a silver medal at the 1995 Pan American Games in Mar del Plata, Argentina in the men's 4x400 metres relay, alongside Orville Taylor, Roxbert Martin, and Michael McDonald. Blake set his personal best in the men's 400 metres (45.68) on 2000-06-18 in Chapel Hill, North Carolina.

In 1996, under the tutelage of AAMU track and field program coach, Walter Tullis, Blake represented Jamaica at the 1996 Summer Olympics in Atlanta, Georgia and won a bronze medal.

Results

Recognition
 In 2006, he was inducted into the Alabama A&M University Athletics Hall of Fame
 City of Huntsville, Alabama - Resolution No. 96-791
 Resolution of the Madison County Commission

References

1970 births
Living people
People from Saint Elizabeth Parish
Jamaican male sprinters
Athletes (track and field) at the 1992 Summer Olympics
Athletes (track and field) at the 1994 Commonwealth Games
Athletes (track and field) at the 1995 Pan American Games
Athletes (track and field) at the 1996 Summer Olympics
Olympic bronze medalists for Jamaica
Commonwealth Games medallists in athletics
Medalists at the 1996 Summer Olympics
Pan American Games silver medalists for Jamaica
Olympic bronze medalists in athletics (track and field)
Commonwealth Games silver medallists for Jamaica
Pan American Games medalists in athletics (track and field)
Universiade medalists in athletics (track and field)
Universiade silver medalists for Jamaica
Medalists at the 1997 Summer Universiade
Medalists at the 1995 Pan American Games
Medallists at the 1994 Commonwealth Games